The Uganda women's national cricket team represents Uganda in international women's cricket. They played their first matches as part of a triangular series that also involved Kenya and Kenya's A side in January 2006. They played in the African regional qualifiers for the 2009 World Cup in December 2006 against Kenya, Tanzania and Zimbabwe. They finished third in the tournament.

History
In April 2018, the International Cricket Council (ICC) granted full Women's Twenty20 International (WT20I) status to all its members. Therefore, all Twenty20 matches played between Uganda women and another international side since 1 July 2018 have been full WT20I matches. In July 2018, Uganda played its first WT20I match against Scotland in 2018 ICC Women's World Twenty20 Qualifier in the Netherlands. In June 2019, Uganda women scored 314 runs against Mali in the Kwibuka Women's T20 Tournament, the highest total for any team, male or female, in a T20 international match.

In December 2020, the ICC announced the qualification pathway for the 2023 ICC Women's T20 World Cup. Uganda were named in the 2021 ICC Women's T20 World Cup Africa Qualifier regional group, alongside ten other teams.

In 2023, the Uganda Cricket Association announced the introduction of central contracts for twelve women players.

Tournament history

ICC Women's T20 World Cup Qualifier
 2018: 6th (DNQ)

ICC Women's Twenty20 Qualifier Africa
 2017: Winner (Qualified)
 2019: 4th (DNQ)

Records and Statistics 

International Match Summary — Uganda Women
 
Last updated 21 December 2022

Twenty20 International 

 Highest team total: 314/2 v. Mali on 20 June 2019 at Gahanga International Cricket Stadium, Kigali.
 Highest individual score: 116, Prosscovia Alako v. Mali on 20 June 2019 at Gahanga International Cricket Stadium, Kigali. 
 Best individual bowling figures: 6/11, Phiona Kulume v. Namibia on 23 April 2022 at Trans Namib Ground, Windhoek.

Most T20I runs for Uganda Women

Most T20I wickets for Uganda Women

T20I record versus other nations

Records complete to T20I #1336. Last updated 21 December 2022.

Squad

This lists all the players who played for Uganda in the past 12 months or were named in the most recent squad. Updated on 18 Jun 2022.

See also
 List of Uganda women Twenty20 International cricketers

References

External links
Fixtures from Uganda's first matches
Scorecards for African World Cup qualifiers in December 2006

National
+Women
Cricket
Women's national cricket teams
Women
Women's sport in Uganda